Pevensey Bay railway station serves Pevensey Bay in East Sussex, England. It is on the East Coastway Line, and train services are provided by Southern.

It was opened by the London, Brighton and South Coast Railway on 11 September 1905, and was originally named Pevensey Bay Halt. It was renamed Pevensey Bay on 5 May 1969.

The station was the setting for an episode of The Goon Show called 'The Pevensey Bay Disaster' which was first broadcast in 1956.

Services 

The station is unmanned and offers a limited service. Since May 2018, only four trains on weekdays serve the station heading towards Hastings and Ashford International, and only five heading towards Eastbourne .  There are no weekend services.

References

External links 

Railway stations in East Sussex
DfT Category F2 stations
Former London, Brighton and South Coast Railway stations
Railway stations in Great Britain opened in 1905
Railway stations served by Govia Thameslink Railway
Bay railway station